Pale Green Ghosts is the second solo album by former The Czars frontman John Grant, released on March 11, 2013, on the Bella Union label. Recorded in Reykjavík and produced by Icelandic musician Birgir Þórarinsson, the album features a range of local musicians alongside Irish singer Sinéad O'Connor providing backing vocals.

The title refers to the Russian olive trees that stand along the I-25 highway near Grant's childhood home in Parker, Colorado. The track "Pale Green Ghosts" includes a string arrangement inspired by the second movement of Prelude in C-sharp minor by Rachmaninoff. Pale Green Ghosts was chosen as Album of the Year 2013 by Rough Trade.

Track listing

Personnel
John Grant – Lead vocals, Synth programming
Chris Pemberton – Piano
Sinéad O'Connor - Backing vocals
Arnar Geir Ómarsson - Drums
McKenzie Smith - Drums
Jakob Smári Magnússon - Bass 3,10
Paul Alexander - Bass
Pétur Hallgrímsson - Guitar
Óskar Gudjónsson – Saxophone
Birgir Þórarinsson (a.k.a. Biggi Veira) - Synth programming

Charts

Weekly charts

Year-end charts

References

2013 albums
John Grant (musician) albums
Bella Union albums